Acragas leucaspis is a species of jumping spider in the genus Acragas. The scientific name of this species was first published in 1900 by Eugène Simon. These spiders are  found in Venezuela.

References

External links 

leucaspis
Endemic fauna of Venezuela
Spiders of South America
Spiders described in 1900